This article contains a list of birds found in the Sierra de Manantlán Biosphere Reserve, which straddles the states of Colima and Jalisco in Mexico. The reserve is located in the transition of the Nearctic and Neotropical realms and encompasses parts of the Sierra Madre del Sur, with a wide range of altitudes, climates and soils. The effects of tectonic and volcanic activities and erosion are notable within the reserve.

Forest types in the reserve including mesophytic, cloud, and dry deciduous and semi-deciduous tropical forests. Anthropologists know the region as Zona de Occidente, an area notably different to the rest of Mesoamerica. Some ceramic remnants, figurines and graves have been found, but there is little other material evidence. As of 1995 almost 8,000 people lived in the Reserva de la Biosfera Manantlan, engaged mainly in agriculture (corn, beans, tomatoes, sugar cane, watermelon, mangoes), livestock grazing, timber production, and extraction of wood for fuel and mining of coal or minerals. Another 30,000 lived in the surrounding communities and almost 700,000 in the surrounding region of influence.

Ecological characteristics

The Sierra de Manantlán Biosphere Reserve is located to the extreme north of the intertropical convergence zone. The climate in the region is influenced by various factors in addition to its latitude, such as its proximity to the coast, the effect of its landform – orographic shade – and the breadth of the altitudinal range, which partly goes to explain the high regional biodiversity and the presence of numerous plant formations ranging from tropical forests to those of temperate-cold climates.

The biosphere reserve's varied and complex plant cover harbors a great wealth of flora. There are over 2900 species of vascular plants belonging to 981 genera. Wildlife is one of the important components of the high biodiversity in this reserve. Among the main values of the biosphere reserve, in addition to its great wealth of species and its unique biogeographical characteristics, is the presence of endangered or useful endemic species. So far 110 species of mammals have been reported, among which the Mexican vole Microtus mexicanus neveriae and the pocket gopher Cratogeomys gymnurus russelli, in addition to other mammals such as the oncilla, the jaguarandi, the ocelot, the puma, the bobcat, the jaguar and four species of nectarivorous bats.

Three hundred and thirty-six species of birds have been reported, among them thirty-six which are endemic to Mexico, such as the charismatic species: the crested guan (Penelope purpurascens), the military macaw (Ara militaris), the red-lored amazon (Amazona autumnalis) and the Mexican national symbol, the golden eagle. In terms of herpetofauna, 85 species have been recorded. Of these it is known that 13 are endemic to the western and central region of Mexico: the rattlesnake, the black iguana, the frog Shyrrhopus modestus, the beaded lizard (Heloderma horridum) and the Autlan rattlesnake (Crotalus lannomi), an endemic species only reported for the area of Puerto de Los Mazos. Of the 16 species of fish identified, 13 are native and four are endemic to the region.

Tinamiformes

Tinamidae

Crypturellus or Tinamu
Crypturellus cinnamomeus or Tinamu canela: , thicket tinamou, rufescent tinamou, perdis

Anseriformes

Anatidae

Dendrocygna
Dendrocygna autumnalis: , black bellied whistling duck

Cairina
Cairina moschata ssp. domestica: , Muscovy duck

Anas
Anas americana: , American wigeon
Anas cyanoptera: cerceta canela, cinnamon teal
Anas diazi or Anas platyrhynchos ssp. diazi: pato mexicano, Mexican duck
Anas discors: cerceta ala azul, blue winged teal

Aythya
Aythya affinis: pato boludo-menor, lesser scaup

Oxyura
Oxyura jamaicensis: pato tepalcate, ruddy duck

Galliformes

Cracidae

Ortalis
Ortalis poliocephala: , west Mexican chachalaca

Penelope
Penelope purpurascens: pava cojolita, crested guan

Odontophoridae

Colinus
Colinus virginianus: codorniz cotuí, northern bobwhite

Cyrtonyx
Cyrtonyx montezumae: codorniz Moctezuma, Montezuma quail

Dactylortyx
Dactylortyx thoracicus: codorniz silbadora, tindorinda, singsong quail

Dendrortyx
Dendrortyx macroura: codorniz-coluda neovolcánica, gallinita, long tailed wood partridge

Philortyx
Philortyx fasciatus: codorniz rayada, banded quail

Podicipediformes

Podicipedidae

Tachybaptus
Tachybaptus dominicus: , least grebe

Podilymbus
Podilymbus podiceps: zambullidor pico grueso, pied billed grebe

Pelecaniformes

Phalacrocoracidae

Nannopterum
Nannopterum brasilianum: , Neotropic cormorant

Ciconiiformes

Ardeidae

Ardea
Ardea alba: , great white egret
Ardea herodias: garza morena, great blue heron

Botaurus
Botaurus lentiginosus: avetoro norteño, American bittern

Bubulcus
Bubulcus ibis: garza ganadera, cattle egret

Butorides
Butorides virescens: garceta verde, green heron

Egretta
Egretta caerulea: garceta azul, pichichi, little blue heron
Egretta thula: garceta pie-dorado, snowy egret
Egretta tricolor: garceta tricolor, tricolored heron

Nycticorax
Nycticorax nycticorax: pedrete corona negra, black crowned night heron

Ciconiidae

Mycteria
Mycteria americana: cigüeña americana, la ciguena, wood stork

Threskiornithidae

Plegadis
Plegadis chihi: ibis cara blanca, white faced ibis

Accipitriformes

Cathartidae

Cathartes
Cathartes aura: , aura, turkey vulture

Coragyps
Coragyps atratus: zopilote común, zopilote alas blancas, black vulture

Accipitridae

Pandion
Pandion haliaetus: aguilla pescadora, gavilán pescador, osprey

Chondrohierax
Chondrohierax uncinatus: gavilan coracolero, gavilán pico gancho, hook-billed kite

Elanus
Elanus leucurus: milano cola blanca, white-tailed kite

Circus
Circus cyaneus: gavilán rastrero, northern harrier, marsh hawk

Accipiter
Accipiter striatus: San Miguilito, gavilán pecho blanco, sharp-shinned hawk
Accipiter cooperii: gavilán de Cooper, Cooper's hawk
Accipiter gentilis: gavilán azor, northern goshawk

Buteo
Buteo plagiatus: aguililla gris, el busardo gris, gavilán saraviado, grey hawk
Buteo brachyurus: aguililla cola corto, gavilán rabicorto, short-tailed hawk
Buteo albonotatus: aguililla zopilota, aguililla aura, aguilucho negro, zone-tailed hawk
Buteo jamaicensis: aguililla cola roja, red-tailed hawk
Buteo platypterus: aguililla, halconcillo, aguila ala ancha, gavilán ala ancho, broad-winged hawk

Buteo or Rupornis
Buteo magnirostris: aguililla caminera, roadside hawk

Buteo or Geranoaetus
Buteo albicaudatus: aguililla cola blanca, gavilán coliblanco, aguilucho alas largas, white-tailed hawk

Aquila
Aquila chrysaetos: aguila real, golden eagle

Spizaetus
Spizaetus ornatus: aguilla chonguda, aguila elegante, ornate hawk-eagle

Harpyhaliaetus or Buteogallus
Harpyhaliaetus solitarius: aguilla negra, aguilla solitario, solitary eagle

Geranospiza
Geranospiza caerulescens: gavilán zancón, crane hawk

Parabuteo
Parabuteo unicinctus: aguililla rojinegra, Harris's hawk

Falconiformes

Falconidae

Micrastur
Micrastur semitorquatus: , collared forest-falcon

Caracara
Caracara plancus: kelele, caracara quebrantahuesos, crested caracara

Herpetotheres
Herpetotheres cachinnans: halcón guaco, laughing falcon

Falco
Falco sparverius: quiliqui, cernícalo americano, American kestrel
Falco rufigularis: wauw, halcón eenano, bat falcon
Falco peregrinus: halcón peregrino, peregrine falcon
Falco columbarius: halcón esmerejón, merlin

Gruiformes

Rallidae

Porphyrio
Porphyrio martinica: , purple gallinule

Gallinula
Gallinula chloropus: gallineta frente roja, common moorhen

Fulica
Fulica americana: choca, hayno, gallareta americana, American coot

Aramidae

Aramus
Aramus guarauna: carrao, limpkin

Charadriiformes

Charadriidae

Charadrius
Charadrius vociferus: , chorlitejo colirrojo, chorlo gritón, killdeer

Recurvirostridae

Himantopus
Himantopus mexicanus: candelero americano, black-necked stilt

Jacanidae

Jacana
Jacana spinosa: gurupiche, jacana norteña, northern jacana

Scolopacidae

Actitis
Actitis macularia: playero manchado, andarríos maculado, playero alzacolita, spotted sandpiper

Columbiformes

Columbidae

Patagioenas
Patagioenas fasciata: , collareja, paloma de collar, band-tailed pigeon
Patagioenas flavirostris: huilota morada, paloma piquirroja, paloma morada, red-billed pigeon

Zenaida
Zenaida asiatica: huilota alas blancas, la tórtola aliblanca, paloma aliblanca, paloma ala blanca, white-winged dove
Zenaida macroura: la huilota, tórtola, rabiche, paloma huilota, mourning dove

Columbina
Columbina inca: toritos, la tortolita mexicana, tórtola cola larga, Inca dove
Columbina passerina: torcacita, la tortolita azul, cococha, columbita común, tórtola coquita, common ground-dove
Columbina talpacoti: tortolita, columbina colorada, cocochita, tórtola rojiza, ruddy ground-dove

Leptotila
Leptotila verreauxi: paloma montaraz común, paloma arroyera, white-tipped dove

Geotrygon
Geotrygon montana: perdiz cara roja, parirí, paloma-perdiz rojiza, ruddy quail-dove

Psittaciformes

Psittacidae

Aratinga or Eupsittula
Aratinga canicularis: , perico frente naranja, orange-fronted parakeet

Aratinga
Ara militaris: guacamaya verde, military macaw

Forpus
Forpus cyanopygius: cotorrita mexicana, perico catarina, Mexican blue-rumped parrotlet

Amazona
Amazona finschi: loro corona lila, lilac-crowned parrot
Amazona oratrix: loro cabeza amarilla, yellow-headed parrot

Rhynchopsitta
Rhynchopsitta pachyrhyncha: cotorra-serrana occidental, thick-billed parrot

Cuculiformes

Cuculidae

Coccyzus
Coccyzus minor: , mangrove cuckoo
Coccyzus erythropthalmus: cuclillo piquinegro, cuclillo pico negro, black-billed cuckoo
Coccyzus americanus: cuclillo piquigualdo, cuclillo pico amarillo, yellow-billed cuckoo

Piaya
Piaya cayana: cuclillo canela, cuclillo ardilla, squirrel cuckoo

Geococcyx
Geococcyx velox: correcaminos chico, correcaminos menor, correcaminos tropical, lesser roadrunner

Morococcyx
Morococcyx erythropygus: cuclillo terrestre, cuclillo sabanero, lesser ground-cuckoo

Crotophaga
Crotophaga sulcirostris: garrapatero pijuy, groove-billed ani

Strigiformes

Tytonidae

Tyto
Tyto alba: , lechuza común, lechuza blanca, common barn-owl

Strigidae

Otus
Otus flammeolus: tecolote ojo oscuro, flammulated owl

Megascops
Megascops guatemalae: autillo guatemalteco, tecolote vermiculado, vermiculated screech-owl
Megascops trichopsis: autillo bigotudo, tecolote bigotudo, tecolote rítmico, whiskered screech-owl

Bubo
Bubo virginianus: búho cornudo, great horned owl

Glaucidium
Glaucidium gnoma: tecolote serrano, northern pygmy-owl (mountain)
Glaucidium brasilianum: tecolote bajeño, ferruginous pygmy-owl
Glaucidium palmarum: tecolote colimense, Colima pygmy-owl

Athene
Athene cunicularia: tecolote llanero, burrowing owl

Strix
Strix varia: búho listado, barred owl
Strix occidentalis: búho manchado, spotted owl
Strix virgata: búho café, mottled owl

Asio
Asio stygius: búho cara oscura, stygian owl
Asio flammeus: búho cuerno corto, short-eared owl

Aegolius
Aegolius acadicus: lechuza norteña, mochuelo cabezón, tecolotito cabezón, tecolote abetero norteño, tecolote afilador, northern saw-whet owl

Caprimulgiformes

Caprimulgidae

Chordeiles
Chordeiles minor: , atajacaminos común, añapero yanqui, añapero boreal, common nighthawk
Chordeiles minor: chordeiles acutipennis, chotacabras menor, lesser nighthawk

Nyctidromus
Nyctidromus albicollis: chotacabras pauraque, pauraque
Nyctiphrynus mcleodii: tapacamino prío, eared poorwill

Caprimulgus
Caprimulgus ridgwayi: chotacabras tucuchillo, tapacamino tu-cuchillo, buff-collared nightjar
Caprimulgus vociferus: caprimulgus vociferus, tapacamino cuerporruín-norteño, northern whippoorwill

Nyctibiidae

Nyctibius
Nyctibius jamaicensis: pecuy, tapacamino, bienparado norteño, northern potoo

Apodiformes

Apodidae

Cypseloides
Cypseloides niger: , black swift
Cypseloides storeri: vencejo frente blanca, whitefronted swift
Cypseloides cryptus: vencejo barbiblanco, white-chinned swift

Streptoprocne
Streptoprocne rutila: vencejo cuello castaño, chestnut-collared swift
Streptoprocne semicollaris: vencejo nuca blanca, white-naped swift

Chaetura
Chaetura vauxi: vencejo de Vaux, Vaux's swift

Aeronautes
Aeronautes saxatalis: vencejo gorgiblanco, vencejo pecho blanco, whitethroated swift

Panyptila
Panyptila sanctihieronymi: vencejo tijereta mayor, greater swallowtailed swift

Trochilidae: hummingbirds or chupa rosas

Phaethornis
Phaethornis mexicanus or Phaethornis longirostris ssp. mexicanus: ermitaño mexicano, Mexican hermit

Colibri
Colibri thalassinus: colibrí orejiazul, colibrí oreja violeta, green violetear

Chlorostilbon
Chlorostilbon auriceps: esmeralda mexicana, golden crowned or forktailed emerald

Cynanthus
Cynanthus latirostris: colibrí pico ancho, broad-billed hummingbird

Thalurania
Thalurania ridgwayi: ninfa mexicana, Mexican woodnymph

Hylocharis
Hylocharis leucotis: zafiro oreja blanca, white eared hummingbird

Amazilia
Amazilia beryllina: colibrí berilo, amazilia berilina, chuparrosa, berylline hummingbird
Amazilia rutila: colibrí canela, cinnamon hummingbird

Ramosomyia
Ramosomyia violiceps: colibrí corona violeta, violet crowned hummingbird

Lampornis
Lampornis amethystinus: colibrí garganta amatista, amethyst throated hummingbird
Lampornis clemenciae: colibrí garganta azul, colibrí gorjiazul, blue throated hummingbird

Eugenes
Eugenes fulgens: colibrí magnífico, magnificent hummingbird

Heliomaster
Heliomaster constantii: colibrí picudo, colibrí pochotero, plain capped starthroat

Tilmatura
Tilmatura dupontii: colibrí cola pinta, sparkling tailed hummingbird

Archilochus
Archilochus colubris: colibrí garganta rubí, ruby throated hummingbird
Archilochus alexandri: colibrí barba negra, black chinned hummingbird

Calothorax
Calothorax lucifer: colibrí horroros, colibrí lucifer, tijereta norteña, Lucifer hummingbird

Calypte
Calypte costae: colibrí cabeza violeta, Costa's hummingbird

Stellula
Stellula calliope: colibrí garganta rayada, calliope hummingbird

Atthis
Atthis heloisa: zumbador mexicano, bumblebee hummingbird

Selasphorus
Selasphorus platycercus: zumbador cola ancha, broad tailed hummingbird
Selasphorus rufus: guicicil, rufous hummingbird
Selasphorus sasin: zumbador de Allen, Allen's hummingbird

Trogoniformes

Trogonidae

Trogon
Trogon citreolus: , citreoline trogon
Trogon mexicanus: trogón mexicano, mountain trogon
Trogon elegans: trogón elegante, elegant trogon

Euptilotis
Euptilotis neoxenus: trogón orejón, quetzal mexicano, eared trogon, quetzal

Coraciiformes

Momotidae

Momotus
Momotus mexicanus: , russet crowned motmot

Alcedinidae

Megaceryle
Megaceryle torquata: martín pescador de collar, ringed kingfisher
Megaceryle alcyon: martín pescador norteño, belted kingfisher

Chloroceryle
Chloroceryle amazona: martín pescador amazónico, Amazon kingfisher
Chloroceryle americana: martín pescador verde, green kingfisher

Piciformes

Picidae

Momotus
Melanerpes formicivorus: , acorn woodpecker
Melanerpes chrysogenys: carpintero enmascarado, golden cheeked woodpecker
Melanerpes aurifrons: carpintero cheje, golden-fronted woodpecker

Sphyrapicus
Sphyrapicus thyroideus: chupasavia oscuro, Williamson's sapsucker
Sphyrapicus varius: chupasavia maculado, yellow-bellied sapsucker

Picoides
Picoides scalaris: carpintero mexicano, ladderbacked woodpecker
Picoides villosus: carpintero velloso mayor, hairy woodpecker
Picoides arizonae: carpintero de Arizona, Arizona woodpecker

Veniliornis
Veniliornis fumigatus: carpintero café, smoky brown woodpecker

Colaptes
Colaptes auricularis: carpintero corona gris, gray crowned woodpecker
Colaptes auratus: carpintero de pechera, northern (common) flicker

Dryocopus
Dryocopus lineatus: carpintero lineado, lineated woodpecker

Campephilus
Campephilus guatemalensis: carpintero pico plata, pale billed woodpecker

Passeriformes

Dendrocolaptidae

Sittasomus
Sittasomus griseicapillus: , olivaceous woodcreeper

Xiphorhynchus
Xiphorhynchus flavigaster: trepatroncos bigotudo, ivory billed woodcreeper

Lepidocolaptes
Lepidocolaptes leucogaster: trepatroncos escarchado, white striped woodcreeper

Grallariidae

Grallaria
Grallaria guatimalensis: hormiguero cholino escamoso, scaled antpitta

Tyrannidae

Camptostoma
Camptostoma imberbe: mosquero lampiño, northern beardless-tyrannulet

Myiopagis
Myiopagis viridicata: elenia verdosa, greenish elaenia

Contopus
Contopus cooperi: pibí boreal, olive sided flycatcher
Contopus pertinax: pibí tengofrío, greater pewee
Contopus sordidulus: pibí occidental, western wood-pewee

Empidonax
Empidonax traillii: mosquero saucero, willow flycatcher
Empidonax albigularis: mosquero garganta blanca, white-throated flycatcher
Empidonax minimus: mosquero mínimo, least flycatcher
Empidonax hammondii: mosquero de Hammond, Hammond's flycatcher
Empidonax oberholseri: mosquero oscuro, dusky flycatcher
Empidonax affinis: mosquero pinero, pine flycatcher
Empidonax difficilis: mosquero californiano, Pacific-slope flycatcher
Empidonax occidentalis: mosquero barranquerño, cordilleran flycatcher
Empidonax fulvifrons: mosquero pecho leonado, buff-breasted flycatcher

Sayornis
Sayornis nigricans: papamoscas negro, black phoebe
Sayornis saya: papamoscas llanero, Say's phoebe

Pyrocephalus
Pyrocephalus rubinus: mosqueros cardenal, vermilion flycatcher

Attila
Attila spadiceus: atila, bright-rumped attila

Myiarchus
Myiarchus tuberculifer: papamoscas triste, dusky capped flycatcher
Myiarchus cinerascens: papamoscas cenizo, ash throated flycatcher
Myiarchus nuttingi: papamoscas de Nutting, Nutting's flycatcher
Myiarchus tyrannulus: papamoscas tirano, brown-crested flycatcher

Ramphotrigon
Ramphotrigon flammulatum: papamoscas jaspeado, flammulated flycatcher

Pitangus
Pitangus sulphuratus: luis bienteveo, great kiskadee

Megarynchus
Megarynchus pitangua: luis pico grueso, boat billed flycatcher

Myiozetetes
Myiozetetes similis: luis gregario, social flycatcher

Myiodynastes
Myiodynastes luteiventris: papamoscas atigrado, sulphur bellied flycatcher

Tyrannus
Tyrannus melancholicus: tirano tropical, tropical kingbird
Tyrannus vociferans: tirano gritón, Cassin's kingbird
Tyrannus crassirostris: tirano pico grueso, thick-billed kingbird
Tyrannus verticalis: tirano pálido, western kingbird

Pachyramphus
Pachyramphus major: mosquero cabezón mexicano, gray-collared becard
Pachyramphus aglaiae: mosquero cebezón degollado, rose throated becard

Tityra
Tityra semifasciata: titira emmascarada, masked tityra

Laniidae

Lanius
Lanius ludovicianus: alcaudón verdugo, loggerhead shrike

Vireonidae

Vireo
Vireo brevipennis: vireo pizarra, slaty vireo
Vireo bellii: vireo de Bell, Bell's vireo
Vireo atricapilla: vireo gorra negra, black-capped vireo
Vireo nelsoni: vireo enano, dwarf vireo
Vireo cassinii: vireo de Cassin, Cassin's vireo
Vireo plumbeous or Vireo solitarius: vireo plomozo, plumbeous vireo
Vireo huttoni: vireo reyezuelo, Hutton's vireo
Vireo hypochryseus: vireo dorado, golden vireo
Vireo gilvus: vireo gorjeador, warbling vireo
Vireo flavoviridis: vireo verde-amarillo, yellow-green vireo

Vireolanius
Vireolanius melitophrys: vireón pecho castaño, chestnut-sided shrike vireo

Corvidae

Calocitta
Calocitta colliei: urraca hermosa cara negra, black-throated magpie jay
Calocitta formosa: urraca hermosa cara blanca, white-throated magpie jay

Cyanocorax
Cyanocorax yncas: chara verde, green jay
Cyanocorax sanblasianus: chara de San Blas, San Blas jay

Aphelocoma
Aphelocoma ultramarina: chara pecho gris, Mexican jay, grey breasted jay

Corvus
Corvus corax: cuervo común, common raven

Hirundinidae

Progne
Progne sinaloae: golondrina sinaloense, Sinaloa martin
Progne chalybea: golondrina acerada, gray-breasted martin

Tachycineta
Tachycineta bicolor: golondrina bicolor, tree swallow
Tachycineta thalassina: golondrina verdemar, violet-green swallow

Stelgidopteryx
Stelgidopteryx serripennis: golondrina ala aserrada, northern rough winged swallow

Hirundo
Hirundo rustica: golondrina tijereta, barn swallow

Calocitta
Petrochelidon pyrrhonota: golondrina de acantilado, cliff swallow

Paridae

Poecile
Poecile sclateri: carbonero mexicano, Mexican chickadee

Progne
Baeolophus wollweberi: carbonero embridado, bridled titmouse

Aegithalidae

Psaltriparus
Psaltriparus minimus: sastrecillo, verdin

Sittidae

Sitta
Sitta carolinensis: sita pecho blanco, white-breasted nuthatch

Certhiidae

Certhia
Certhia americana: trepador americano, brown creeper

Troglodytidae

Campylorhynchus
Campylorhynchus gularis: matraca serrana, spotted wren

Catherpes
Catherpes mexicanus: chivirín barranqueño, canyon wren

Thryothorus
Thryothorus sinaloa: chivirín sinaloense, Sinaloa wren
Thryothorus felix: chivirin feliz, happy wren

Uropsila
Uropsila leucogastra: chivirín vientre blanco, white-bellied wren

Thryomanes
Thryomanes bewickii: chivirín cola oscura, Bewick's wren

Troglodytes
Troglodytes aedon: chivirín saltapared, house wren
Troglodytes brunneicollis: chivirín garganta café, brown-throated (house) wren

Henicorhina
Henicorhina leucophrys: chivirín pecho gris, grey-breasted wood wren

Cinclidae

Cinclus
Cinclus mexicanus: mirlo acuático norteamericano, American dipper

Regulidae

Regulus
regulus calendula: reyezuelo de rojo, ruby-crowned kinglet
Regulus satrapa: reyezuelo de oro, golden-crowned kinglet

Sylviidae

Polioptila
Polioptila caerulea: perlita azulgris, blue-gray gnatcatcher
Polioptila nigriceps: perlita sinaloense, black-capped gnatcatcher

Turdidae

Sialia
Sialia sialis: azulejo garganta canela, eastern bluebird

Myadestes
Myadestes occidentalis: clarín jilguero, brown-backed solitaire

Catharus
Catharus aurantiirostris: zorzal pico naranja, orange-billed nightingale-thrush
Catharus occidentalis: zorzal mexicano, russet nightingale-thrush
Catharus frantzii: zorzal de Frantzius, ruddy-capped nightingale-thrush
Catharus ustulatus: zorzal de Swainson, Swainson's thrush
Catharus guttatus: zorzal cola rufa, hermit thrush

Turdus
Turdus assimilis: mirlo garganta blanca, white-throated robin
Turdus rufopalliatus: mirlo dorso rufo, rufous backed robin
Turdus migratorius: mirlo primavera, American robin

Ridgwayia
Ridgwayia pinicola: mirlo pinto, Aztec thrush

Mimidae

Mimus
Mimus polyglottos: centzontle norteño, northern mockingbird

Toxostoma
Toxostoma curvirostre: cuitlacoche pico curvo, curve-billed thrasher

Melanotis
Melanotis caerulescens: mulato azul, blue mockingbird

Motacillidae

Anthus
Anthus rubescens: bisbita de agua, water (American) pipit
Anthus spragueii: bisbita llanera, Sprague's pipit

Bombycillidae

Bombycilla
Bombycilla cedrorum: ampelis chinito, cedar waxwing

Ptilogonatidae

Ptilogonys
Ptilogonys cinereus: capulinero gris, gray silky flycatcher

Peucedramidae

Peucedramus
Peucedramus taeniatus: ocotero enmascarado, olive warbler

Parulidae

Vermivora
Vermivora celata: chipe corona naranja, orange-crowned warbler
Vermivora ruficapilla: chipe de coronilla, Nashville warbler
Vermivora virginiae: chipe de Virginia, Virginia's warbler
Vermivora crissalis: chipe crisal, Colima warbler
Vermivora luciae: chipe rabadilla rufa, Lucy's warbler

Parula
Parula superciliosa: parula ceja blanca, crescent-chested warbler
Parula pitiayumi: parula tropical, tropical parula

Dendroica
Dendroica petechia: chipe amarillo, yellow warbler
Dendroica magnolia: chipe de magnolia, magnolia warbler
Dendroica coronata: chipe coronado, yellow-rumped warbler
Dendroica nigrescens: chipe negrogris, black-throated gray warbler
Dendroica virens: chipe dorso verde, black-throated green warbler
Dendroica townsendi: chipe negroamarillo, Townsend's warbler
Dendroica occidentalis: chipe cabeza amarillo, hermit warbler
Dendroica graciae: chipe ceja amarilla, Grace's warbler
Dendroica palmarum: chipe playero, palm warbler

Mniotilta
Mniotilta varia: chipe trepador, black and white warbler

Setophaga
Setophaga ruticilla: chipe flameante, American redstart

Seiurus
Seiurus aurocapilla: chipe suelero, ovenbird
Seiurus noveboracensis: chipe charquero, northern waterthrush
Seiurus motacilla: chipe arroyero, Louisiana waterthrush

Oporornis
Oporornis tolmiei: chipe de Tolmiei, MacGillivray's warbler

Geothlypis
Geothlypis trichas: mascarita común, common yellowthroat
Geothlypis poliocephala: mascarita pico grueso, gray-crowned yellowthroat

Wilsonia
Wilsonia citrina: chipe encapuchado, hooded warbler
Wilsonia pusilla: chipe corona negra, Wilson's warbler

Cardellina
Cardellina rubrifrons: chipe cara roja, red faced warbler

Ergaticus
Ergaticus ruber: chipe rojo, red warbler

Myioborus
Myioborus pictus: chipe ala blanca, painted redstart
Myioborus miniatus: chipe de montaña, slate-throated redstart

Euthlypis
Euthlypis lachrymosa: chipe de roca, fan-tailed warbler

Basileuterus
Basileuterus rufifrons: chipe gorra rufa, rufous-capped warbler
Basileuterus culicivorus: chipe corona dorada, golded-crowned warbler
Basileuterus belli: chipe ceja dorada, golden-browed warbler

Icteria
Icteria virens: buscabreña, yellow-breasted chat

Thraupidae

Rhodinocichla
Rhodinocichla rosea: tángara cuitlacoche, rosy thrush tanager

Saltator
Saltator coerulescens: picurero grisáceo, grayish saltator

Emberizidae

Volatinia
Volatinia jacarina: semillero brincador, blue-black grassquit

Sporophila
Sporophila torqueola: semillero de collar, white-collared seedeater

Amaurospiza
Amaurospiza relicta: semillero azulgris, slate blue seedeater

Diglossa
Diglossa baritula: picaflor canelo, cinnamon-bellied flowerpiercer

Atlapetes
Atlapetes pileatus: atlapetes gorra rufa, rufous-capped brush-finch

Arremon
Arremon virenticeps: atlapetes rayas verdes, green-striped brush-finch

Arremonops
Arremonops rufivirgatus: rascador oliváceo, olive sparrow

Melozone
Melozone kieneri: rascador nuca rufa, rusty-crowned ground-sparrow

Pipilo
Pipilo ocai: toquí de collar, collared towhee
Pipilo chlorurus: toquí cola verde, green-tailed towhee
Pipilo fuscus: toquí pardo, canyon (brown) towhee

Aimophila
Aimophila ruficauda: zacatonero corona rayada, stripe-headed sparrow
Aimophila humeralis: zacatonero pecho negro, black-chested sparrow
Aimophila botterii: zacatonero de Botteri, Botteri's sparrow
Aimophila ruficeps: zacatonero corona rufa, rufous-crowned sparrow
Aimophila rufescens: zacatonero rojizo, rusty sparrow

Amphispizopsis
Amphispizopsis quinquestriata: zacatonero cinco rayas, five-striped sparrow

Spizella
Spizella passerina: gorrión ceja blanca, chipping sparrow
Spizella pallida: gorrión palido, clay-colored sparrow

Pooecetes
Pooecetes gramineus: gorrión cola blanca, vesper sparrow

Chondestes
Chondestes grammacus: gorrión arlequin, lark sparrow

Passerculus
Passerculus sandwichensis: gorrión sabanero, Savannah sparrow

Ammodramus
Ammodramus savannarum: gorrión chapulin, grasshopper sparrow

Melospiza
Melospiza melodia: gorrión cantor, song sparrow
Melospiza lincolnii: gorrión de Lincoln, Lincoln's sparrow

Zonotrichia
Zonotrichia leucophrys: gorrión corona blanca, white-crowned sparrow

Junco
Junco phaeonotus: junco ojo de lumbre, yellow-eyed junco

Icteridae

Agelaius
Agelaius phoeniceus: tordo sargento, red-winged blackbird

Xanthocephalus
Xanthocephalus xanthocephalus: tordo cabeza amarilla, yellow-headed blackbird

Sturnella
Sturnella magna: pradero tortilla-con-chile, eastern meadowlark

Euphagus
Euphagus cyanocephalus: tordo ojo amarillo, Brewer's blackbird

Quiscalus
Quiscalus mexicanus: zanate mexicano, great-tailed grackle

Molothrus
Molothrus aeneus: tordo ojo rojo, bronzed cowbird
Molothrus ater: tordo cabeza café, brown-headed cowbird

Icterus
Icterus wagleri: bolsero de Wagleri, black-vented oriole
Icterus spurius: bolsero castaño, orchard oriole
Icterus cucullatus: bolsero encapuchado, hooded oriole
Icterus pustulatus: bolsero dorso rayado, streak-backed oriole
Icterus bullockii: bolsero calandria, northern (Bullock's) oriole
Icterus graduacauda: bolsero cabeza negra, Audubon's (black-headed) oriole
Icterus galbula: bolsero de Baltimore, northern (Baltimore) oriole
Icterus parisorum: bolsero tunero, Scott's oriole

Cacicus
Cacicus melanicterus: cacique mexicano, yellow-winged cacique

Fringillidae

Euphonia
Euphonia affinis: eufonia garganta negra, scrub euphonia
Chlorophonia elegantissima: eufonia capucha azul, blue-hooded euphonia

Carpodacus
Carpodacus mexicanus: pizón mexicano, house finch

Loxia
Loxia curvirostra: picotuerto rojo, red crossbill

Spinus
Spinus pinus or Carduelis pinus: jilguero pinero, pine siskin
Spinus notatus or Carduelis notatus: jilguero encapuchado, black-headed siskin
Spinus psaltria or Carduelis psaltria: jilguero dominico, lesser goldfinch

Passeridae

Passer
Passer domesticus: gorrión casero, house sparrow

See also
Plants of the Sierra de Manantlán Biosphere Reserve
Reptiles of the Sierra de Manantlán Biosphere Reserve

References

Sierra de Manantlan